The 20th Korean Music Awards was held in Seoul, South Korea on March 5, 2023. Hosted by the Korean Music Awards Selection Committee and sponsored by the Ministry of Culture, Sports and Tourism and the Korea Creative Content Agency, the ceremony recognized the best music released in South Korea between December 1, 2021, and November 30, 2022.

Unlike other South Korean music awards, the Korean Music Awards are based on musical achievement rather than  record sales. Winners are determined by the Korean Music Awards Selection Committee panel comprising music critics, radio show producers, academics, and other music industry professionals.

Nominations were announced on February 9, 2023. Newcomer girl group NewJeans received the most nominations with six, including in all three daesang categories. Producer 250 won the most awards of the night with four, while NewJeans won a total of three awards; 250 also served as the producer for the works NewJeans were nominated for.

Winners and nominees

Main awards 
Winners are listed first, highlighted in boldface, and indicated with a double dagger (‡). Nominees are listed in alphabetical order.

Special awards
 Achievement Award – Love & Peace

References 

2023 in South Korean music
2023 music awards